Miami MLS team may refer to:
Miami Fusion (1997–2001)
Inter Miami CF (2018–present)